Colours of Time is the sixth album of composer Peter Michael Hamel, released in 1980 through Kuckuck Schallplatten.

Track listing

Personnel
Peter Michael Hamel – electronic organ, synthesizer
Ulrich Kraus – electric organ, synthesizer, engineering

References

1980 albums
Kuckuck Schallplatten albums
Peter Michael Hamel albums